Sir John Sandeman Allen (26 September 1865 – 3 June 1935) was a British Conservative Party politician. He was a Member of Parliament (MP) for Liverpool West Derby from 1924 until he died in office in 1935.

References

External links 
 

1865 births
1935 deaths
Conservative Party (UK) MPs for English constituencies
UK MPs 1924–1929
UK MPs 1929–1931
UK MPs 1931–1935
Members of the Parliament of the United Kingdom for Liverpool constituencies
Knights Bachelor